Kari Dickson is a British translator who specializes in translating works of Norwegian literature into English. She grew up in Edinburgh but spent her summers in Norway with maternal grandparents who did not speak English. She graduated in Scandinavian Studies at UCL, and worked in the theatre for some time. She did literal translations of two Ibsen plays (The Lady from The Sea and Hedda Gabler), which drove her interest in literary translation, eventually leading to an MA degree in translation from the University of Surrey.

Initially she worked as a commercial translator, including several years at the Norwegian central bank. She has since shifted her focus to literature, including literary fiction and non-fiction, Norwegian noir, children's books and stage plays.

She now teaches Norwegian language, literature and translation at the University of Edinburgh.

Translations
 Constance Ørbeck-Nilssen & Akin Düzakin: Fargene som forsvant, Vanishing Colors, 2019, Wm. B. Eerdmans Publishing Co.
 Håkon Øvreås & Øyvind Torseter: Brune, Brown, 2019, Enchanted Lion Books, winner of the American Library Association’s Mildred L. Batchelder Award 2020
 Thomas Enger: Killerinstinkt, Inborn, 2019, Orenda Books
 Rune Christiansen: Fanny og mysteriet i den sørgende skogen, Fanny and the Mystery in the Grieving Forest, 2019, Book*hug Press
 Erika Fatland: The Border
 Erika Fatland: Sovjetistan, Sovietistan, 2019, Maclehose Press
 Thomas Enger: Banesår, Killed, 2018, Orenda
 Gunnhild Øyehaug: Vente, blinke, Wait Blink, 2018, Farrar, Straus & Giroux
 Karin Fossum: Hviskeren, The Whisperer, 2018, Harvill Secker
 Karin Fossum: Helvetesilden, Hellfire, 2017, Harvill Secker
 Hans Olav Lahlum: Mauruemordene, The Anthill Murders, 2017, Mantle
 Gunnhild Øyehaug: Knutar, Knots, 2017, Farrar, Straus & Giroux
 Thomas Enger: Våpenskjold, Cursed, 2017, Orenda Books
 Arne Svingen: Sangen om en brukket nese, The Ballad of a Broken Nose, 2016, Margaret K. McElderry Books
 Hans Olav Lahlum: Kameleonmenneskene, Chameleon People, 2016, Mantle
 Beate Grimsrud: En dåre fri, A Fool, Free, 2015, Head of Zeus
 Selma Lønning Aarø: Jeg kommer snart, I'm Coming, 2015, House of Anansi Press Inc.
 Roslund & Hellström: Three Seconds, winner of the CWA International Dagger 2011

References

Year of birth missing (living people)
Living people
Alumni of the University of Surrey
British translators
Norwegian literature